William George Horrell (born March 15, 1930) is a former American football quarterback who played for the Philadelphia Eagles. He played college football at Michigan State University, having previously attended New Kensington High School.

References

1930 births
Living people
American football guards
Michigan State Spartans football players
Philadelphia Eagles players
Players of American football from Pennsylvania
People from New Kensington, Pennsylvania